Pachycondyla oligocenica is an extinct species of formicid in the ant subfamily Ponerinae known from a fossil found in eastern Asia.

History and classification
P. oligocenica is known from a single ant found in Russia. The specimen was described from a compression fossil preserved in diatomite deposits of the Bol’shaya Svetlovodnaya site. The fossil-bearing rocks preserve possibly Priabonian plants and animals which lived in and around a small lake near a volcano. The site has been attributed to either the Maksimovka or Salibez Formations and compared to the Bembridge Marls and Florissant Formation, both of which are Priabonian in age.

At the time of description, the holotype male specimen, number PIN 3429/1112 was preserved in the A. A. Borissiak Paleontological Institute collections, part of the Russian Academy of Sciences.  The fossil was first described by the trio of paleomyrmecologists Gennady Dlussky, Alexandr Rasnitsyn and Ksenia Perfilieva.  In the type description, Dlussky, Rasnitsyn and Perfilieva named the species P. oligocenica, with the specific epithet derived "Oligocene" the possible age of the site.

At the time of description, only two other Pachycondyla species males had been described from fossils;  the males of both P. baltica and P. succinea are known from fossils entombed in Eocene age Baltic amber. P. oligocenica is one of two Pachycondyla species that were described by Dlussky, Rasnitsyn and Perfilieva from Bol’shaya Svetlovodnaya, the other species P. aberrans being described from a partial queen or male.

Description
The head has an almost square outline, being slightly shorter than it is wide, and the rear edge is rounded. The large oval shaped eyes convex in shape, protruding slightly from the head capsule. Neither of the mandibles have any teeth along the edges, and they are placed far apart on the head, preventing touching when they close. The antennae are not preserved from the holotype, so the structure and length was unknown at the time of description. The rm cell is not present in the forewing of P. aberrans, distinguishing the two species.

References

Eocene insects
Fossil ant taxa
Fossil taxa described in 2015
Cenozoic insects of Asia
†Pachycondyla oligocenica
Insects described in 2015